Songs from the Movie is a 2014 studio album by American country musician Mary Chapin Carpenter. The album is orchestral music re-recordings of her songs, guided by American composer Vince Mendoza. It has received positive reviews from critics.

Recording and release
 After this album's 2014 release, she performed selections from it with the BBC Scottish Symphony Orchestra at the Celtic Connections festival in Glasgow, Scotland, as well as select performances with domestic orchestras. In 2014, Carpenter's touring schedule included a mix of orchestral performances comprising selections from Songs from the Movie, as well as acoustic sets featuring Jon Carroll, multi-instrumentalist John Doyle, and opening act Tift Merritt. To select the songs, Carpenter collaborated with co-producers Mendoza and Matt Rollings, whittling down a list of songs that were lyrically challenging and told complex stories from throughout her recording career.

Reception
The editorial staff of AllMusic Guide named this the "Best of 2014" and scored it 3.5 out of five stars, with reviewer Thom Jurek noting Carpenter's diverse influences outside of country music and noted how she has "remained vital, productive, and has a track record of consistency most artists would—or at least should—envy" and opining that Mendoza was able to complement her voice with the performers to make an album that is "an almost painterly soundtrack" to Carpenter's life and work. Writing for Country Standard Time, Jeffrey B. Remz thought the album needed "a bit more energy" and "veers decidedly towards the precious and pretty side, but sometimes a bit too much so." The Guardians Robin Deneslow scored Songs from the Movie three out of five stars, calling the experiment a "brave reworking" of her songs that sometimes has the instrumentation overwhelm the songwriting. Nick Coleman of The Independent scored this album two out of five stars, opining that the compositions are good songs by Carpenter, but that they are "fluffed up massively in a compressed space like this, also a rather stifling one".

Track listing
All songs written by Mary Chapin Carpenter
"On and On It Goes" – 4:23
"I Am a Town" – 4:59
"Between Here and Gone" – 5:03
"Ideas Are Like Stars" – 4:14
"The Dreaming Road" – 5:44
"Only a Dream" – 5:53
"Come On Come On" – 5:27
"Mrs. Hemingway" – 6:18
"Where Time Stands Still" – 3:43
"Goodnight America" – 6:06

Personnel

Mary Chapin Carpenter – vocals, production
Dave Arch – piano
Chuck Ainsley – mixing at Sound Stage Studios
John Badbury – violin
Mark Berrow – violin
Richard Berry – horn
Rachel Bolt – viola
Thomas Bowes – violin
Jon Carnac – first clarinet
David Chatterton – bassoon
Luis Conte – percussion on "Goodnight America"
Dave Daniels – cello
Yona Dunsford – choir metro voice
Philip Eastop – horn
Liz Edwards – violin
Richard Edwards – tenor trombone
Peter Erskine – percussion on "On and On It Goes", "I Am a Town", "Between Here and Gone", "Ideas Are Like Stars", "The Dreaming Road", "Only a Dream", "Come On Come On", and "Goodnight America"
Jonathan Evans-Jones – violin
Alice Fearn – choir metro voice
Joanna Forbes – choir metro voice
Soophia Foroughi – choir metro voice
Dave Fuest – clarinet
Roger Garland – violin
Alex Gibson – choir metro voice
Caitlyn Gordon – choir metro voice
Russ Harrington – interior photography
Bill Hawkes – viola
Claire Henry – choir metro voice
Mike Hext – first tenor trombone
Eloise Irving – choir metro voice
Garfield Jackson – viola
Leah Jackson – choir metro voice
Karen Jones – first flute and alto flute
Skaila Kanga – harp
Helen Keen – flute and alto flute
Paul Kegg – cello
Nikki Kennedy – choir metro voice
Gary Kettel – percussion
Mike Kidd – horn
Patrick Kiernan – violin
Boguslaw Kostecki – violin
Peter Lale – first viola
Patrick Lannigan – bass
Chris Laurence – stand-up rhythm
Julian Leaper – violin
Anthony Lewis – cello
Martin Loveday – cello
Bob Ludwig – mastering at Gateway Mastering
Richard Macintyre – cover photography
Steve Mair – bass
Rita Manning – violin
Jane Marshall – oboe
Oren Marshall – tuba
Stephen Maw – contra bassoon
Dani May – choir metro voice
Polly May – choir metro voice
Vince Mendoza – orchestra arrangements, conducting, production
Chloe Morgan – choir metro voice
Kate Musker – viola
Everton Nelson – violin
Anna Noakes – flute and alto flute
Abbie Osmon – choir metro voice
Andy Parker – viola
Chris Parkes – first horn
Tom Pearce – choir master
Tom Pigott-Smith – violin
Anthony Pleeth – first cello
Maciej Rakowski – violin
Jonathan Rees – violin
Frank Ricotti – first percussion
George Robertson – viola
Matt Rollings – additional piano on "Goodnight America", production
Frank Schaefer – cello
Emlyn Singleton – violin
Richard Skinner – first bassoon
Dave Stewart – bass trombone
David Theodore – oboe
Cathy Thompson – violin
Chris Tombling – violin
Rebecca Trehearn – choir metro voice
Michael Valerio – acoustic bass on "On and On It Goes", "I Am a Town", "Between Here and Gone", "Ideas Are Like Stars", "The Dreaming Road", "Only a Dream", "Come On Come On", and "Goodnight America"
Vicci Wardman – viola
Stacey Watton – first bass
Bruce White – viola
Debbie Widdup – violin
Paul Willey – violin
Jonathan Williams – cello
Dave Woodcock – violin

See also
List of 2014 albums

References

External links

 from Rounder Records

2014 albums
Mary Chapin Carpenter albums
Albums produced by Vince Mendoza
Albums produced by Matt Rollings
Classical albums by American artists
Decca Records albums
Rounder Records albums